This is a list of notable Australian Americans, including both original immigrants who obtained American citizenship and their American descendants.

Business

Public service

Politics

Authors

Scientists

Artists

Sport

Music

Actors/actresses

Other

References

Australian Americans
 
Australian
American